Kokuydynkol is a salt lake in the Moiynkum District, Jambyl Region, Kazakhstan.

Geography
Kokuydynkol lies at the northern edge of the Moiynkum Desert, in the lower Chu river basin. There is an elongated island in the middle of the lake, and a small peninsula in the northern shore.

Kokuydynkol is dry most of the year. On average the lake has water right after the melting of the snows, between March and the beginning of May. By June its waters evaporate and it becomes a huge salt flat.

Fauna
Groups of demoiselle cranes have been recorded by the lake during their yearly migration.

See also
List of lakes of Kazakhstan

References

External links
солончак Кокуйдынколь
Chu-Talas, Kazakhstan

Lakes of Kazakhstan
Jambyl Region